Dennis "D. J." Hogg Jr. (born September 3, 1996) is an American professional basketball player for the Cairns Taipans of the National Basketball League (NBL). He played college basketball for the Texas A&M Aggies.

High school career
Hogg starred at Plano West High School and led the Wolves to a Class 6A state title. He hit the game-winning jumper at the buzzer to win the championship against Houston Clear Lake. Hogg was a former top-50 recruit who committed to Texas A&M alongside high school teammate Tyler Davis.

College career
The Aggies reached the Sweet 16 in his freshman season, and Hogg averaged 6.2 points and 2.9 assists per game. As a sophomore, Hogg averaged 12.0 points, 5.1 rebounds and 3.4 assists per game. He was declared out for the season in February 2017 due to a foot injury he suffered in a January 21 game against Georgia. In the Aggies' home opener on November 16, Hogg contributed 24 points, six rebounds, three assists and two blocks in a comfortable win versus UC Santa Barbara. On December 21, Hogg was suspended for three games due to an undisclosed violation of team rules. He led the Aggies to a surprise win over North Carolina in the second round of the 2018 NCAA Tournament. He scored 14 points on 5-of-11 shooting, including 3-of-7 from behind the 3-point line in the win. He averaged  11.1 points, 5.3 rebounds and 2.6 assists per game as a junior. On April 9, 2018, Hogg decided to forgo his senior year at Texas A&M and enter the 2018 NBA Draft.

Professional career
After going undrafted in the 2018 NBA draft, Hogg played for the New Orleans Pelicans in the NBA Summer League. He signed with the Philadelphia 76ers on October 10, and was then waived two days later. He subsequently joined the Delaware Blue Coats of the NBA G League for the 2018–19 season.

Hogg played for the Wisconsin Herd of the NBA G League during the 2019–20 season after his rights were traded in September 2019.

Hogg played for the Lakeland Magic during the G League hub season between February and March 2021. He averaged 9.2 points, 4.6 rebounds, and 1.5 assists per game.

In August 2021, Hogg played for the Orlando Magic during the 2021 NBA Summer League. He then joined Cholet Basket in France for the 2021–22 Pro A season.

On July 12, 2022, Hogg signed with the Cairns Taipans in Australia for the 2022–23 NBL season.

References

External links

Texas A&M Aggies bio
NBADraft.net bio
G-League Statistics at Basketball-Reference.com
Twitter handle

1996 births
Living people
American expatriate basketball people in Australia
American expatriate basketball people in France
American men's basketball players
Basketball players from Columbus, Ohio
Basketball players from Texas
Cairns Taipans players
Cholet Basket players
Delaware Blue Coats players
Lakeland Magic players
Power forwards (basketball)
Sportspeople from Plano, Texas
Texas A&M Aggies men's basketball players
Wisconsin Herd players